Rhipidia maculata  is a Palearctic species of craneflies in the family Limoniidae.It is found in  a wide range of habitats and micro habitats: in earth rich in humus, in swamps and marshes, in leaf litter and in wet spots in woods.

References

External links 
Ecology of Commanster

Limoniidae